Famous Last Words may refer to:

 List of last words, collection of last words attributed to historical figures before their death

Music 
 Famous Last Words (band), an American metal band

Albums 
 Famous Last Words (Al Stewart album), 1993
 Famous Last Words (Hedley album), 2007
 ...Famous Last Words..., by Supertramp, 1982
 Famous Last Words, by Captain Tractor, 2011
 Famous Last Words, by M (Robin Scott), 2000

Songs 
 "Famous Last Words" (My Chemical Romance song), 2007
 "Famous Last Words" (Tears for Fears song), 1990
 "Famous Last Words", by Billy Joel from River of Dreams
 "Famous Last Words", by Deerhunter from Rainwater Cassette Exchange
 "Famous Last Words", by James Blake from Friends That Break Your Heart
 "Famous Last Words", by Jars of Clay from If I Left the Zoo
 "Famous Last Words", by Lowgold from Welcome to Winners
 "Famous Last Words", by Sole from Bottle of Humans
 "Famous Last Words", by Ty Dolla Sign from Beach House 3
 "Famous Last Words", by Zeromancer from Zzyzx

Television episodes
 "Famous Last Words" (Buddies)
 "Famous Last Words" (Castle)
 "Famous Last Words" (Oz)
 "Famous Last Words" (Touched by an Angel)

Other uses
 Famous Last Words (novel), a 1981 novel by Timothy Findley
 Famous Last Words, a cartoon series by Irwin Caplan
 Famous Last Words, a 2007 film starring Jan Uddin (as Jan Dean)

See also

 "Famous Last Words of a Fool", a song by George Strait
 Last words (disambiguation)
 The Last Word (disambiguation)